Millington Glacier is a narrow tributary glacier,  long, flowing from the eastern slopes of the Hughes Range, Antarctica, into Ramsey Glacier, northward of Mount Valinski. It was named by the Advisory Committee on Antarctic Names for Lieutenant Commander Richard E. Millington, U.S. Navy, a medical officer with Operation Deep Freeze, 1963 and 1964.

References

Glaciers of Dufek Coast